Tom McAnearney (6 January 1933 – 14 February 2012) was a Scottish football player and manager.

Born in Dundee, he played at Sheffield Wednesday, with his brother Jim, and later at Peterborough United and Aldershot. After he retired he joined the Sheffield Wednesday coaching staff. He spent one season as manager of Crewe Alexandra.

In the early 1970s he took over as manager at Aldershot and managed them to their first ever promotion during the 1972-73 season and their highest ever league finish the following season.

McAnearney died on 14 February 2012, aged 79, from undisclosed causes.

External links

Tom was a serviceman in the Royal Air Force, serving at RAF workshop in 1955.

1933 births
2012 deaths
Footballers from Dundee
Scottish footballers
Sheffield Wednesday F.C. players
Peterborough United F.C. players
Aldershot F.C. players
Aldershot F.C. managers
Bury F.C. managers
Crewe Alexandra F.C. managers
English Football League players
English Football League managers
Association football wing halves
Place of death missing
Scottish football managers